Michael or Mike Genovese may refer to:

 Michael James Genovese (1919–2006), allegedly a leader of the Pittsburgh crime family
 Michael Genovese (artist) (born 1976), American artist
 Mike Genovese (born 1942), American actor